Richard Halleck Brodhead (born April 17, 1947) is an American scholar of 19th-century American literature and served as the ninth president of Duke University.

Early life and education
Brodhead was born April 17, 1947, in Dayton, Ohio. His family moved to Fairfield, Connecticut when he was six years old, where he attended public schools. He went on to attend Phillips Academy, where his high school classmates included Dick Wolf and George W. Bush. Brodhead graduated from Yale College in 1968 summa cum laude (with Highest Distinction in the English major). During his senior year at Yale was tapped for membership in the secret society Manuscript and a member of the Elizabethan Club.  He continued at Yale for graduate school and earned a Ph.D. in English in 1972. He met his wife, Cynthia Degnan, while both were graduate students at Yale.

Career at Yale
After receiving his Ph.D. in 1972, Brodhead was appointed an assistant professor of English at Yale. In 1980, he received tenure and was named Director of Undergraduate Studies in English. By 1985, he had been made a full professor and was named chair of the English department as Bird White Housum Professor of English. He was appointed Dean of Yale College in 1993 and served until 2004. Together with Yale President Richard C. Levin, Brodhead oversaw a major curricular review at Yale.

An expert in 19th-century American literature, Brodhead has written or edited more than a dozen books on Nathaniel Hawthorne, Herman Melville, Charles W. Chesnutt, William Faulkner, Harriet Beecher Stowe, Louisa May Alcott, Richard Wright and Eudora Welty, among others.  His scholarly work has been honored by election to the American Academy of Arts and Sciences. Brodhead won the DeVane Medal for outstanding teaching at Yale and spent eight summers teaching high school teachers at the Bread Loaf School at Middlebury, Vermont. He has lectured widely in universities in the United States, Europe, and Asia.

As dean and as a professor supervising graduate students, Brodhead was involved in the controversy surrounding efforts by graduate student-employees (GESO) to unionize; he was accused of attempting to blacklist unionist students.  In 2003, Brodhead was named a defendant along with, Richard Levin, Linda Lorimer in a lawsuit by Yale professor James Van de Velde claiming damage of reputation after Van de Velde was accused of murdering Suzanne Jovin, a female student, and Brodhead subsequently canceled his class citing his presence as a "major distraction."  In 2007, A Connecticut Judge reopened Velde's lawsuit against Brodhead et al.

Career at Duke

He left New Haven in 2004 to become President of Duke University, succeeding Nan Keohane.  Much of his leadership at Duke was focused on enriching the undergraduate experience of Duke students and expanding the university’s financial aid endowment to ensure that a Duke education is accessible to qualified students regardless of their family’s financial circumstances.  He called for Duke to become an international center in addressing health care inequities through a major global health initiative involving faculty and schools across the university, and championed Duke’s efforts to bring the fruits of faculty and student research through a translational process to serve society.  Brodhead was also active in Durham, promoting K-12 public education, several new community health clinics, neighborhood revitalization through the Duke-Durham Neighborhood Partnership, and the future strategic direction of the Research Triangle Park.

Brodhead led the successful Financial Aid Initiative, which raised $308.5 million for need-based scholarships at Duke at its conclusion in 2008.

His signature program was DukeEngage, which "empowers students to address critical human needs through immersive service, in the process transforming students, advancing the University’s educational mission, and providing meaningful assistance to communities in the U.S. and abroad". More than 300 students participate in DukeEngage each summer.

Brodhead made globalization a major strategic priority for the University.   Under his leadership Duke established the Duke Global Health Institute, an interdisciplinary center that works to translate research findings to address health care inequities and improve the health of people around the world. He oversaw the creation of the Duke-NUS Graduate Medical School in partnership with the National University of Singapore. Duke Kunshan University, a new joint venture institution created by Duke University and Wuhan University in China, opened in August 2014, offering degree and non-degree academic programs for students from China and around the world.

Brodhead was the first university president to live in the official presidential residence, the J. Deryl Hart House, since the 1960s. Presidents prior to Brodhead lived in the Douglas M. and Grace Knight House.

Brodhead led Duke Forward, a comprehensive fundraising campaign.  As the largest campaign in Duke’s history, it aimed to raise $3.25 billion by 2017 to enrich the Duke experience and give Duke’s talented students, faculty, and medical practitioners opportunities to advance ideas, make new connections, and move the world forward.

Brodhead serves on the board of trustees of the Carnegie Corporation of New York and the Federal Bureau of Investigation’s National Security Higher Education Advisory Board.

Under his leadership, Duke’s investments strengthened K-12 public education, funded several new community health clinics, and spurred downtown renewal and neighborhood revitalization through the Duke-Durham Neighborhood Partnership. He was also involved in shaping the strategic direction of the Research Triangle Park of North Carolina.

On April 28, 2016, Brodhead announced that he would end his tenure as Duke's president on June 30, 2017, then take a one-year sabbatical before returning to academia as a writer and instructor.

Duke lacrosse case
Brodhead's actions during the Duke lacrosse case proved controversial after three members of the nationally ranked men's lacrosse team were falsely accused of raping a stripper hired to perform at a team party off campus on March 13, 2006. Brodhead originally stated  on March 25, 2006, that "our students must be presumed innocent until proven otherwise," but later reneged on the statement after pressure from Duke faculty. He then also stated without regard to the evidence that "whatever they did is bad enough", while talking about the horrors of sexual assault and racism in society. Brodhead canceled the remainder of the 2006 season shortly after the Athletic Director fired Duke's lacrosse coach Mike Pressler. Student body president Elliott Wolf opined that Brodhead faced a public perception "that [Duke] simply washes its hands of students".

On December 20, 2006, Brodhead stated that "the DA's case will be on trial just as much as our students will be". On January 3, 2007, Brodhead invited the accused students back to Duke as students in good standing and members of the lacrosse team even though they still faced charges. On April 11, 2007, the N.C. Attorney General's Office dropped all charges against the players, declared them innocent, and called them victims of a rogue prosecutor's "tragic rush to accuse".

Later, Brodhead apologized in a public forum for the university's "failure to reach out" in a "time of extraordinary peril". Brodhead and more than 30 other individuals were named as defendants in the lawsuit filed in 2008 by the unindicted members of the lacrosse team.

Notes

 

Presidents of Duke University
Duke University faculty
Yale University faculty
Yale College alumni
Phillips Academy alumni
People from Dayton, Ohio
1947 births
Living people
People from Fairfield, Connecticut
American university and college faculty deans
Yale Graduate School of Arts and Sciences alumni
20th-century American academics
21st-century American academics